Antonio Whybrew (4 November 1894 – 7 December 1924) was a Guyanese cricketer. He played in two first-class matches for British Guiana in 1922/23 and 1923/24.

See also
 List of Guyanese representative cricketers

References

External links
 

1894 births
1924 deaths
Guyanese cricketers
Guyana cricketers
Sportspeople from Georgetown, Guyana